Hypoglossum is a genus of red algae belonging to the family Delesseriaceae.

The genus has cosmopolitan distribution.

Species:

Hypoglossum anomalum 
Hypoglossum attenuatum 
Hypoglossum barbatum 
Hypoglossum caloglossoides 
Hypoglossum hypoglossoides 
Hypoglossum retusum
Hypoglossum simulans 
Hypoglossum tenuifolium

References

Delesseriaceae
Red algae genera